Nicholas Joseph Offer (born 1972) is a New York City–based musician. He is best known as the vocalist of the dance-punk band !!!, which he helped form in Sacramento, California, in 1996.  Offer played bass and keyboards for the electronic band Out Hud from 1996 until 2005.

Nic is noted for his energetic dancing while performing in a pair of blue shorts which have been described as "hot pants", "short shorts", "swim shorts" and "pool boy shorts".

Footnotes

References

External links
 Nic Offer Interview at A.V Club website
 Nic Offer Interview at ArtistDirect.com

1972 births
Living people
American rock singers
!!! members
21st-century American singers